Paul Abbott (born 22 February 1960) is an English television screenwriter and producer. Abbott has become one of the most critically and commercially successful television writers working in Britain, following his work on popular series such as Coronation Street, Cracker and Shameless, the last of which he created. He is also responsible for the creation of some of the most acclaimed television dramas of the 1990s and 2000s, including Reckless and Touching Evil for ITV and Clocking Off and State of Play for the BBC.

Background
Born into a dysfunctional Burnley family, Paul Abbott is the seventh of eight children. When he was nine his mother left home to pursue a relationship with another man (with a child around Abbott's own age); his father, who Abbott describes as having been "bone idle", departed two years later. His mother had supported the family from three jobs. Abbott and his siblings were in the care of their pregnant seventeen-year-old sister. His father didn't claim benefits for the family, for fear of alerting social services to their abandonment. Although a compulsive truant, Abbott cites his English teacher at Barden High School as an early positive influence.

Age 11 he was raped by a stranger, leading to him jumping from the roof of a multi-story car park in an attempt to take his own life. Two years later after another suicide attempt he was sectioned into an adult mental hospital for a short while, later becoming a voluntary patient. On his release, he was taken into foster care and placed with a much more settled working-class family than his own, where having both adults in steady employment was a new experience for Abbott, as was their ownership of a television and a car. At the same time he began attending a local Sixth Form College and started attending meetings of the Burnley Writers' Circle after seeing their advert in the local public library. Abbott enrolled at the University of Manchester in 1980 to study psychology but decided to leave to concentrate on writing when a radio play was accepted by the BBC.

Career
Abbott entered the Radio Times drama competition at the age of 22 which had the requirement to find a professional sponsor. A contact knew the address of the leading British dramatist Alan Bennett who, after seeing his script, was of the opinion that Abbott had written a perfectly acceptable piece of work which he would be happy to endorse. His work on radio plays for BBC Radio 4 attracted the attention of producers at Granada Television who hired him, at age twenty-four, to be a script editor on their long-running soap opera Coronation Street. This made him at the time the youngest-ever person to occupy such a role on the programme.

He worked on Coronation Street for the next eight years as a story editor and from 1989 as a writer. He also worked on other programmes for Granada. In 1988, he co-wrote his first televised drama script, a one-off play for the Dramarama anthology, with fellow Coronation Street writer Kay Mellor. The same year, he and Mellor co-created the children's medical drama Children's Ward, which ran for many years—Abbott regularly contributed scripts until 1992, then returned briefly to the show in 1996.

In 1994, he worked as the producer on the second season of Granada's drama series Cracker, about the work of a criminal psychologist played by Robbie Coltrane. The following year he switched to writing scripts for the programme and wrote several episodes. He made his first breakthrough with a programme of his own creation, the police drama serial Touching Evil in 1997. The series, starring popular actor Robson Green, was a success, and two sequel serials—although not written by Abbott—followed. Most recently, in 2004, the series was re-made for American television by the USA Network.

After writing another serial starring Green, Reckless and a few other productions for Granada, he began in 1999 a collaboration with the independent Red Production Company. He contributed an episode to their anthology series Love in the 21st Century, screened on Channel 4, and in 2000 created and wrote the series Clocking Off for them, which was screened on BBC One. Set in one factory in Lancashire, the series focused on a different member of factory staff each episode. The first season won the BAFTA award for Best Drama Series, and the equivalent at the Royal Television Society awards; Abbott personally was recognised with the RTS Best Writer award. Clocking Off ran for four seasons, although Abbott's contributions to the final two runs were minimal as he was by this time busy working on other projects.

In 2001, he created another Red series screened on BBC One, the comedy-drama Linda Green; although this was somewhat less successful and ran for only two seasons before cancellation. In 2000, he was due to adapt the D. H. Lawrence novel Sons and Lovers as a four-part television serial but pulled out due to work commitments.

2002 saw Abbott experimenting with a new genre when he wrote the political thriller State of Play, which was directed by David Yates and produced for the BBC by Hilary Bevan-Jones. In late 2003, Abbott and Bevan-Jones founded their own independent production company, Tightrope Pictures, based in Soho, London.

In early 2004, Channel 4 screened Shameless, a new Abbott series very loosely based on his experiences and family life growing up in Burnley, although the action of the programme itself was changed to Manchester in the present day. At the 2006 British Academy Television Awards, he was given the honorary Dennis Potter Award for Outstanding Writing in Television, and in July of the same year Radio Times magazine placed him at No. 5 in a poll of industry professionals to find The Most Powerful People in Television Drama. Abbott was the highest-placed writer on the list, those above him being actors and executives.

Tightrope Pictures have produced several high-profile dramas for the BBC, including Richard Curtis's The Girl in the Café (also directed by David Yates for BBC One, 2005) and an adaptation of William Golding's novel To the Ends of the Earth (BBC Two, 2005). In 2009, Abbott acted as executive producer on the film version of State of Play for Universal Pictures.

The first series of No Offence aired on Channel 4 beginning in May 2015. In 2021, Sky Max would broadcast Abbott's newest crime series, Wolfe.

Academic
In July 2006, it was announced that the University of Salford had appointed Abbott as a visiting professor, and in the same month Manchester Metropolitan University awarded him with an honorary doctorate. Abbott's November 2006 lecture at Salford entitled "The 21st Century Box" explored how media is changing and provided 'first aid for British television makers'. Attendees included the Mayor and Mayoress of Salford. In 2013 Dr Beth Johnson (University of Leeds) published the first book-length academic study of Abbott's work (with Manchester University Press). In 2015  Abbott was awarded an honorary doctorate from Keele University.

Writing credits

Awards and nominations

References
General

Specific

External links
 
"Writers Room", Question and Answer with Paul Abbott, BBC website
Paul Abbott entry at the British Film Institute's screenonline
Paul Abbott to work with MA Students at Salford University
Abbott Receives Honorary Doctorate from Manchester Metropolitan University
 Royal Television Society Past Award Winners (Downloadable PDF)
 Desert Island Discs

1960 births
Living people
Academics of the University of Salford
Alumni of Manchester Metropolitan University
Alumni of the Victoria University of Manchester
BAFTA winners (people)
Edgar Award winners
English soap opera writers
English television producers
English television writers
People from Burnley
Showrunners
Television show creators
English male writers
British male television writers